Iron Chef Australia is an Australian cooking show based on the Japanese show Iron Chef, as well as its American adaptation Iron Chef America. The program is a sort of culinary game show, with each episode seeing a challenger chef competing against one of the resident "Iron Chefs" in a one-hour cooking competition based on a theme ingredient.

The show was put into production by the Seven Network mainly to capitalise on the success of the Network Ten cooking show MasterChef Australia, and is produced by that show's current production company Shine Australia. It premiered on Seven on 19 October 2010.

Overview

Iron Chef Australia features production design and presentation similar to Iron Chef America. In addition Mark Dacascos reprises his role as The Chairman from Iron Chef America. The show is recorded at Docklands Studios in Melbourne.

In contrast to previous versions of the format, the show features a static judging panel composed of food critics Larissa Dubecki, Simon Thomsen and Leo Schofield. The programme is hosted by Grant Denyer, with additional commentary provided by Richard Cornish.

The Iron Chefs

Results

Reception

The premiere episode of the show debuted with an average of 1.129 million viewers, coming in seventh in ratings for the night. It competed against and was bettered by Top Gear Australia, another Australian adaptation of a popular international TV series.

References

External links
 

Seven Network original programming
2010 Australian television series debuts
2010 Australian television series endings
Australian television spin-offs
Australian cooking television series
Television shows set in Melbourne
Australia
Cooking competitions in Australia
Australian television series based on Japanese television series